The 1944-45 Palestine League was a special edition of the Palestine League, designated as a "test league". For this season, 14 teams took part in the league, divided into two regional leagues. The northern division was won by Hapoel Tel Aviv, while the southern district was won by Beitar Tel Aviv.

The two regional winners were due to meet at the end of the season in two friendly matches, however these matches weren't played, and currently the IFA recognize both team as league champions for this season.

League tables

Northern Division

Note : herzlija were deducted 100000 points, but got them back, their record were expunged and it came back, it retired

Southern Division

References
100 Years of Football 1906-2006, Elisha Shohat (Israel), 2006, pp. 132–136

Palestine League seasons
Palestine
1944–45 in Mandatory Palestine football